High Stakes is a British sitcom starring Richard Wilson that aired in 2001. It was written by Tony Sarchet. The second series remains unaired.

Plot
Nicholas Quinn, a former Treasury official, is the new chairman of an investment bank called Kendrick Maple, a company that is in need of modernising. The managing director is long-standing employee Bruce Morton and he is outraged by Quinn's attempt to modernise. Between them is young, high-flyer Greg Hayden, who often acts as a mediator.

Cast
Richard Wilson as Bruce Morton
Jack Shepherd as Nicholas Quinn
Jason O'Mara as Greg Hayden

Episodes

A second series of High Stakes was written and made and was due to air in winter 2001.

DVD releases
The first series and unaired second series was released on DVD in Region 2 (UK) on 14 May 2007, distributed by Acorn Media UK.

References
Mark Lewisohn, "Radio Times Guide to TV Comedy", BBC Worldwide Ltd, 2003
British TV Comedy Guide for High Stakes

External links 
 

2001 British television series debuts
2001 British television series endings
2000s British sitcoms
ITV sitcoms